Girls Shouldn't Walk Alone at Night is a Canadian short drama film, directed by Katerine Martineau and released in 2020. The film stars Amaryllis Tremblay and Nahéma Ricci as Chantal and Delphine, two young women who open up about their feelings for each other while walking home from their high school graduation party.

The film premiered at the 2020 Vancouver International Film Festival. It was subsequently screened at the 2021 Canadian Film Festival, where Martineau won the award for Best Director of a Short Film and Tremblay won the award for Breakout Performance in a Short Film, and at the 2021 Saguenay International Short Film Festival, where it won the 100% Régions award.

The film won the Canadian Screen Award for Best Live Action Short Drama at the 10th Canadian Screen Awards in 2022.

References

External links
 

2020 films
2020 short films
2020 LGBT-related films
Canadian drama short films
Canadian LGBT-related short films
Best Live Action Short Drama Genie and Canadian Screen Award winners
French-language Canadian films
2020s Canadian films